The Lotto Thüringen Ladies Tour, formerly known as the Thüringen Rundfahrt der Frauen (Women's Tour of Thuringia) is a stage race for women road cycle racers held every July in the German state of Thuringia. It is rated a class 2.1 event by the Union Cycliste Internationale (UCI). The title sponsor is LOTTO Thüringen, the state lottery of Thuringia.

List of winners
Source:

References

External links
 

 
Recurring sporting events established in 1986
1986 establishments in East Germany
Women's road bicycle races